The Division 3 Féminine, shortened as D3 Féminine, is the third division of women's football in France. Run by the French Football Federation, the league is contested by forty fully professional clubs.

References

External links
  Official website
   FootoFéminin

2002 establishments in France
Sports leagues established in 2002
Football leagues in France
Women's football competitions in France
Professional sports leagues in France